QMH may stand for:

 Queens Moat Houses
Queen Mary's Hospital (disambiguation), various hospitals
Queen Mary Hospital station, Hong Kong, MTR station code QMH